Scott Christopher Williams (born March 21, 1968) is a retired American professional basketball player in the National Basketball Association (NBA). Standing at 6' 10", he was capable of playing as a power forward or a center. Early in his professional career, Williams earned three NBA Finals rings as he contributed off the bench during the Chicago Bulls' first three-peat championships from 1991–1993. He developed into a front-court reserve during his fifteen seasons in the NBA, where he was known for his hustle and strong defense.  Since his retirement, Williams has coached in the NBA Development League and NBA as well as commentating for a variety of NBA teams.  Williams is currently the color analyst for the Grand Canyon Antelopes men's basketball team.

Early life and college career
Williams attended and played basketball for Glen A. Wilson High School in Hacienda Heights, California. He led the 1986 squad to the 1986 C.I.F State Championship Title. Williams was named a McDonald's All-American in 1986.

He enrolled at the University of North Carolina.
Williams' parents died on October 15, 1987, when his father shot and killed his mother in their garage, then turned the gun on himself. He was 19 years old, and was in his sophomore year at the University of North Carolina at Chapel Hill; coach Dean Smith notified him of the tragedy.

Growing up, Williams was a passionate Los Angeles Lakers fan.

College statistics

|-
| align="left" | 1986–87
| align="left" | North Carolina
| 36 || 1 || 15.0 || .497 || .000 || .558 || 4.2 || 0.9 || 0.8 || 0.8 || 5.5
|-
| align="left" | 1987–88
| align="left" | North Carolina
| 34 || 33 || 26.5 || .572 || .429 || .673 || 6.4 || 1.2 || 1.3 || 1.3 || 12.8
|-
| align="left" | 1988–89
| align="left" | North Carolina
| 35 || 30 || 22.9 || .556 || .000 || .654 || 7.3 || 0.7 || 0.9 || 1.4 || 11.4
|-
| align="left" | 1989–90
| align="left" | North Carolina
| 33 || 30 || 24.6 || .554 || .143 || .615 || 7.3 || 0.8 || 1.1 || 1.2 || 14.5
|- class="sortbottom"
| style="text-align:center;" colspan="2"| Career
| 138 || 94 || 22.1 || .551 || .235 || .633 || 6.2 || 0.9 || 1.0 || 1.2 || 10.9
|}

Professional career
Undrafted in the 1990 NBA Draft, after four years in college, Williams was signed by the Chicago Bulls in 1990. He played four seasons in Chicago, mostly as a reserve, and won three championship rings in his very first three NBA seasons. On 7 June 1991, in game 3 of the Finals against the Los Angeles Lakers, he scored four points (all from the free throw line), grabbed two rebounds, and had two assists in only 11 minutes of play, in an eventual 104–96 overtime Bulls win. On February 16, 1994, Williams scored his career-high of 22 points in a 109-101 loss against the Miami Heat.
 
In 1994, Williams was signed by the Philadelphia 76ers, where he played for 4½ injury-plagued seasons before being traded to the Milwaukee Bucks in 1999. His career saw a resurgence of sorts in Milwaukee, where he averaged career-highs of 7.6 points and 6.6 rebounds during the 1999–2000 season. On December 15, of that season, Williams scored 17 points and grabbed 15 rebounds in a win against the Orlando Magic. While in Milwaukee, Williams was considered a key part of the 2001 Bucks team that made it to the conference finals before losing to his former team, the Philadelphia 76ers. Williams was controversially suspended for Game 7 of the Eastern Conference Finals series when a flagrant one foul was upgraded to a flagrant two foul after the game had ended, and the Bucks went on to lose the final game.

Until his retirement in 2005, at the age of 37, he also played for the Denver Nuggets, the Phoenix Suns (one ½ seasons), the Dallas Mavericks (27 games), and the Cleveland Cavaliers.

During his final season, he became LeBron James's oldest teammate and the only one born in the 1960s.

NBA career statistics

Regular season

|-
| style="text-align:left;background:#afe6ba;" | 1990–91†
| align="left" | Chicago
| 51 || 0 || 6.6 || .510 || .500 || .714 || 1.9 || 0.3 || 0.2 || 0.3 || 2.5
|-
| style="text-align:left;background:#afe6ba;" | 1991–92†
| align="left" | Chicago
| 63 || 0 || 11.0 || .483 || .000 || .649 || 3.9 || 0.8 || 0.2 || 0.6 || 3.4
|-
| style="text-align:left;background:#afe6ba;" | 1992–93†
| align="left" | Chicago
| 71 || 5 || 19.3 || .466 || .000 || .714 || 6.4 || 1.0 || 0.8 || 0.9 || 5.9
|-
| align="left" | 1993–94
| align="left" | Chicago
| 38 || 11 || 16.8 || .483 || .200 || .612 || 4.8 || 1.0 || 0.4 || 0.6 || 7.6
|-
| align="left" | 1994–95
| align="left" | Philadelphia
| 77 || 43 || 23.1 || .475 || .000 || .738 || 6.3 || 0.8 || 0.9 || 0.5 || 6.4
|-
| align="left" | 1995–96
| align="left" | Philadelphia
| 13 || 1 || 14.8 || .517 || .000 || .833 || 3.5 || 0.4 || 0.5 || 0.5 || 3.1
|-
| align="left" | 1996–97
| align="left" | Philadelphia
| 62 || 52 || 21.2 || .509 || .000 || .691 || 6.4 || 0.7 || 0.7 || 0.7 || 5.8
|-
| align="left" | 1997–98
| align="left" | Philadelphia
| 58 || 7 || 13.8 || .437 || .000 || .810 || 3.6 || 0.5 || 0.3 || 0.4 || 4.1
|-
| align="left" | 1998–99
| align="left" | Philadelphia
| 2 || 0 || 8.5 || .000 || .000 || .000 || 1.0 || 0.5 || 1.0 || 0.5 || 0.0
|-
| align="left" | 1998-99
| align="left" | Milwaukee
| 5 || 0 || 5.8 || .333 || .000 || .571 || 2.4 || 0.0 || 0.2 || 0.2 || 2.8
|-
| align="left" | 1999–00
| align="left" | Milwaukee
| 68 || 46 || 21.9 || .500 || .000 || .729 || 6.6 || 0.4 || 0.6 || 1.0 || 7.6
|-
| align="left" | 2000–01
| align="left" | Milwaukee
| 66 || 31 || 19.3 || .474 || .250 || .857 || 5.5 || 0.5 || 0.7 || 0.5 || 6.1
|-
| align="left" | 2001–02
| align="left" | Denver
| 41 || 16 || 18.0 || .396 || .000 || .732 || 5.1 || 0.3 || 0.4 || 0.8 || 4.9
|-
| align="left" | 2002–03
| align="left" | Phoenix
| 69 || 33 || 12.6 || .411 || .000 || .786 || 2.8 || 0.3 || 0.4 || 0.3 || 4.0
|-
| align="left" | 2003–04
| align="left" | Phoenix
| 16 || 10 || 16.7 || .525 || 1.000 || .692 || 4.5 || 0.4 || 0.9 || 0.4 || 7.3
|-
| align="left" | 2003–04
| align="left" | Dallas
| 27 || 11 || 9.6 || .435 || .000 || .500 || 2.2 || 0.4 || 0.2 || 0.3 || 3.0
|-
| align="left" | 2004–05
| align="left" | Cleveland
| 19 || 0 || 8.0 || .293 || .000 || .818 || 1.6 || 0.4 || 0.2 || 0.3 || 1.7
|- class="sortbottom"
| style="text-align:center;" colspan="2"| Career
| 746 || 266 || 16.4 || .467 || .111 || .721 || 4.7 || 0.6 || 0.5 || 0.6 || 5.1
|}

Playoffs

|-
| style="text-align:left;background:#afe6ba;" | 1990–91†
| align="left" | Chicago
| 12 || 0 || 6.0 || .462 || .000 || .550 || 1.7 || 0.3 || 0.1 || 0.3 || 1.9
|-
| style="text-align:left;background:#afe6ba;" | 1991–92†
| align="left" | Chicago
| style="background:#cfecec;" | 22* || 0 || 14.6 || .486 || .000 || .714 || 4.3 || 0.3 || 0.3 || 0.8 || 4.0
|-
| style="text-align:left;background:#afe6ba;" | 1992–93†
| align="left" | Chicago
| 19 || 0 || 20.8 || .506 || .000 || .552 || 5.8 || 1.4 || 0.4 || 0.9 || 5.5
|-
| align="left" | 1993–94
| align="left" | Chicago
| 10 || 0 || 15.1 || .421 || .000 || .714 || 3.9 || 0.7 || 0.7 || 0.3 || 6.3
|-
| align="left" | 1999–00
| align="left" | Milwaukee
| 5 || 0 || 18.6 || style="background:#cfecec;" | .639* || .000 || .833 || 5.6 || 0.4 || 0.4 || 1.0 || 10.2
|-
| align="left" | 2000–01
| align="left" | Milwaukee
| 17 || 17 || 22.2 || .492 || .000 || .571 || 7.2 || 0.7 || 0.6 || 1.4 || 7.9
|-
| align="left" | 2002–03
| align="left" | Phoenix
| 6 || 6 || 13.8 || .344 || .000 || 1.000 || 2.5 || 0.2 || 0.7 || 0.5 || 4.0
|-
| align="left" | 2003–04
| align="left" | Dallas
| 3 || 0 || 3.7 || .000 || .000 || .000 || 1.3 || 0.0 || 0.0 || 0.3 || 0.0
|- class="sortbottom"
| style="text-align:center;" colspan="2"| Career
| 94 || 23 || 16.0 || .480 || .000 || .634 || 4.6 || 0.6 || 0.4 || 0.8 || 5.2
|}

Post-retirement
Subsequently, Williams accepted the Cavaliers' offer to become a color commentator for the team's telecasts on FSN Ohio, beginning in 2005–06, and working alongside Michael Reghi. After two seasons, on 20 October 2007, the Milwaukee Journal Sentinel reported he would join the Milwaukee Bucks' commentary team. Besides doing pre and post-game analysis for home games, he also called some games while a popular emailer on the Tony Kornheiser radio show.

In 2008, Williams became a color commentator for another former team, the Phoenix Suns, broadcasting with Tom Leander and Gary Bender.

During the 2012–13 season, Williams was an assistant coach for the Idaho Stampede in the NBA Development League.

Prior to the 2013–14 season, Williams was hired as an assistant coach for the Milwaukee Bucks under Larry Drew.

As of the 2014-15 season, Williams serves as the analyst for Grand Canyon Antelopes men's basketball games on Fox 10 Extra, alongside play-by-play announcer Barry Buetel.

In 2020, on the 'Sixers Talk' podcast, Williams credited Michael Jordan and the Chicago Bulls with helping him have an NBA career. Williams had played four years at North Carolina but had gone undrafted in the NBA draft. Jordan invited Williams to a scrimmage, which also included other NBA pros, so Williams could prove his worth. Later, Jordan called then-Bulls general manager Jerry Krause and stated "I think Scott Williams might be able to help us out". The Bulls would eventually sign Williams and he would earn three NBA Finals rings (in his first three years in the league) when the Bulls capped the first of their two NBA Finals three-peat wins, from 1991-1993. Williams goes on to state "I always say I am the luckiest undrafted player in the history of the NBA, if there is such a thing".

References

External links
NBA.com profile
Stats at Basketball-Reference
Official Website

1968 births
Living people
African-American basketball coaches
African-American basketball players
American men's basketball players
Basketball players from California
Centers (basketball)
Chicago Bulls players
Cleveland Cavaliers players
Dallas Mavericks players
Denver Nuggets players
McDonald's High School All-Americans
Milwaukee Bucks assistant coaches
Milwaukee Bucks players
North Carolina Tar Heels men's basketball players
Parade High School All-Americans (boys' basketball)
People from Hacienda Heights, California
Philadelphia 76ers players
Phoenix Suns announcers
Phoenix Suns players
Power forwards (basketball)
Sportspeople from Los Angeles County, California
Undrafted National Basketball Association players
21st-century African-American people
20th-century African-American sportspeople